The 2013 All-Ireland Senior Hurling Championship was the 126th staging of the All-Ireland championship since its establishment in 1887. The draw for the 2013 fixtures took place on 4 October 2012. The championship began on 5 May 2013 and ended on 28 September 2013 with Clare winning their fourth All Ireland title after a 5–16 to 3–16 win against Cork in the replayed final.

Kilkenny were the defending champions. However, they were knocked out of the Leinster Championship by eventual Leinster champions Dublin at the semi-final stage and Cork saw them off in the All-Ireland quarter-final. Limerick won the Munster Championship for the first time since 1996. Cork defeated Dublin and Clare defeated Limerick in the All-Ireland semi-finals.

The 2013 Championship has been described by many as one of the best ever. In February 2014, the GAA announced that both the 2013 football and hurling Championships brought in €11.9m in gate receipts, an increase of €1.3m for the hurling championship.

The introduction of Hawk-Eye for Championship matches at Croke Park fell foul in a high-profile blunder by the computer system which led to use of Hawk-Eye being suspended during the All-Ireland semi-finals on 18 August. During the minor game between Limerick and Galway, Hawk-Eye ruled a point for Limerick as a miss although the graphic showed the ball passing inside the posts, causing confusion around the stadium - the referee ultimately waved the valid point wide provoking anger from fans, viewers and TV analysts covering the game live. The system was subsequently stood down for the senior game which followed, owing to "an inconsistency in the generation of a graphic". Hawk-Eye admitted they were to blame and as a result Limerick, who were narrowly defeated after extra-time, announced they would be appealing over Hawk-Eye's costly failure. The incident drew attention from the UK, where Hawk-Eye had made its debut in English soccer's Premier League the day before.

Teams
All teams from the 2012 championship continued to line out in hurling's top tier in 2013.

Kilkenny were installed as the favourites to retain the All-Ireland title for a third consecutive year and to secure a remarkable tenth championship in fourteen seasons. Tipperary and Galway, the last two teams to beat Kilkenny in championship hurling, were regarded as the two teams most likely to provide the strongest challenge to Kilkenny's supremacy once again. Limerick were ranked at 20/1 as they hoped to end a forty-year wait for the Liam MacCarthy Cup. Waterford, a team who won four Munster titles between 2002 and 2010, were seen as a team to have missed out on their chance at an All-Ireland title and were ranked at 25/1.
London, the winners of the 2012 Christy Ring Cup, availed of their automatic right to promotion to the top tier and joined the Leinster championship.

Prior to the championship draw it emerged that Croke Park officials had written to the Laois County Board inviting the county hurlers to participate in the 2013 Christy Ring Cup. This was prompted by Laois's poor results during the previous few seasons. In spite of these concerns Laois decided to remain in hurling's top tier and subsequently won two Leinster Championship matches.

Personnel and kits

Summary

Championships

Broadcasting
RTÉ and TV3 provided live coverage and highlights of matches in Ireland on The Sunday Game Live and Championship Live respectively, with RTÉ showing the All-Ireland Final live. Setanta Sports and TG4 showed highlights of matches in Ireland also. Setanta Sports broadcasts live Championship matches in Australia. Also Setanta Sports provided live matches in Asia. 
The Championship Live live programme was presented by Matt Cooper, usually from an on-pitch studio with analysis from Daithí Regan, Jamesie O'Connor, and Nicky English. The Sunday Game live programme was presented by Michael Lyster with analysis usually from Cyril Farrell, Ger Loughnane, Liam Sheedy, and Tomás Mulcahy. 
Highlights of all games were shown on The Sunday Game programme which aired usually at 9:30pm on Sundays on RTÉ Two and was presented by Des Cahill with analysis from Eddie Brennan and Donal Óg Cusack.

Television coverage, in particular that of the Leinster Hurling Championship has been criticised in some circles. Neither RTÉ or TV3 decided to broadcast both Leinster Hurling Championship semi-finals. Both channels also declined the offer from the Leinster GAA to reschedule the Dublin - Kilkenny semi-final replay in order for it to be broadcast.

These matches were broadcast live on television in Ireland

Leinster Senior Hurling Championship

Munster Senior Hurling Championship

All-Ireland qualifiers 
Teams eliminated prior to the semi finals of their provincial championship compete in the preliminary rounds and phase 1. Teams eliminated in the provincial semi finals take part in phase 2. Phase 3 sees the winners of phase 1 take on the winners of phase 2, with the winners advancing to the All Ireland quarter-finals

Preliminary round

Phase 1

Phase 2

Phase 3

All-Ireland Senior Hurling Championship

Quarter-finals

Semi-finals

Final

Statistics

Scoring
 First goal of the championship: Niall O'Brien for Westmeath against Antrim (Leinster preliminary round, 5 May 2013)
Widest winning margin: 20 points
Clare 1-32 - 0-15 Laois (qualifier phase 1)
Most goals in a match: 8
Clare 5-16 - 3-16 Cork (All-Ireland final replay)
Most points in a match: 47
Clare 1-32 - 0-15 Laois (qualifier phase 1)
Most goals by one team in a match: 5
Clare 5-16 - 3-16 Cork (All-Ireland final replay)
 Highest aggregate score: (70 minutes) 56 points
Clare 5-16 - 3-16 Cork (All-Ireland final replay)
Lowest aggregate score: 29 points
Antrim 0-11 - 1-15 Westmeath (qualifier preliminary round)
Most goals scored by a losing team: 4
Offaly 4-9 - 0-26 Kilkenny (Leinster quarter-final)

Top scorers
Overall

Single game

Miscellaneous
 In Carlow's defeat of London in the first round of the Leinster championship, Craig Doyle became the first player in the history of the championship to score three goals after coming on as a substitute.
 In the Leinster semi-final replay, Dublin record a championship defeat of Kilkenny for the first time since 1942.
 The Leinster final was notable for a number of reasons. It was the first final to feature neither Kilkenny or Wexford since 1990. The meeting of Dublin and Galway in the provincial decider was a first, while it was also their first championship meeting since 1942. Dublin maintained their 100% success rate over Galway, with a sixth win from six meetings, to claim the Leinster title for the first time since 1961.
 The Munster final between Cork and Limerick was the sides' first meeting at this stage of the championship since 1992. Limerick's victory was their first provincial title since 1996.
 Cork and Kilkenny's All-Ireland quarter-final meeting at Semple Stadium was their first championship meeting outside of Croke Park since 1907.
 For the first time since 1951, Kilkenny did not play a single championship game in Croke Park. It is also the first time since 1996 that Kilkenny failed to qualify for an All-Ireland semi-final.
 The All-Ireland semi-final between Cork and Dublin was the sides' first meeting in the All-Ireland series since 1952.
 The All-Ireland semi-final between Clare and Limerick was the sides' first ever meeting at this stage of the championship.
 The All-Ireland final was notable for a number of reasons. It was the second ever all-Munster All-Ireland decider and the first time since 1997 that this has happened. It was the first time since 2004 that neither the Leinster or Munster champions contested the All-Ireland final. It was the first ever All-Ireland final meeting of Cork and Clare. For the second successive year the All-Ireland final ended in a draw. The replay was also unique as it was the first All-Ireland final to be played on a Saturday.
 Clare win their fourth All-Ireland title to draw level with Galway and Offaly as joint seventh on the all-time roll of honour.
 Clare's victory also marked the first time a team outside the traditional "Big Three" of hurling (Kilkennny, Cork and Tipperary) had won the All-Ireland since Offaly in 1998.

Notable matches
2013 will be remembered as a year that the traditionally weaker counties made an impact.

Limerick who hadn't been in an All-Ireland Final since 2007 beat reigning Munster Champions Tipperary by 3 points, 1–18 to 1–15 in a Munster semi-final.

Clare under David Fitzgerald held off Waterford in a Munster Quarter-final winning by 2–20 to 1-15. They were overcome by a stronger Cork side in the Munster Semi-final losing 0–23 to 0-15.

Laois made it to the Leinster semi-final where they put it up to Galway even leading by a point at half time [0-08 - 0-07], but Galway's physicality helped them run out 7 point victors [2-17 - 1-13].

Dublin came into the season after a disappointing 2012 season and a hammering by Tipperary in the league semi-final [4-20 0-17]. In their Leinster Quarter-Final they drew with Wexford, 1-17 - 1-17 but in the replay ran out easy 8 point winners, 1-17 - 0-12.

Offaly jumped to a 1–01 to 0–00 start against Kilkenny in their Quarter-Final clash. They led at half time by 2–06 to 0-11 but failed to stop Kilkenny, although they managed to score 4 goals as Kilkenny won 0–26 to 4-09.

In their semi-final Dublin ran at Kilkenny and held out for a draw in the match, 0-17 - 1-14. In the replay Dublin raced to a 0–04 to 0–01 lead after 10 mins and lead 0–11 to 0–07 at half time. They ran out 3 point winners, 1-17 0-17. Dublin made it to a Leinster final while Kilkenny where exiled to the qualifiers for a second year.

Kilkenny fought hard against Tipperary and sent them out of the Championship, winning by three points.

Dublin beat Galway by 12 points to claim their first Leinster title in 52 years.

Kilkenny knocked out Waterford in the final stage of the Qualifiers after extra time.

Carlow lead Wexford for most of their game in the qualifiers, until a late goal sent them out.

At the quarter-final stage, Cork knocked out Championship favourites and title holders, Kilkenny. Clare knocked out Galway, the previous year's runners-up.

Both Provincial Champions were beaten in the semi-finals. Cork defeated Dublin after the game of the season by 1–24 to 1-19, and Clare beat Limerick by 1–22 to 0-18.

The 2013 Championship was described by many as one of the best ever.

Awards
Monthly awards

Sunday Game Team of the Year
The Sunday Game team of the year was picked on 28 September, which was the night of the final replay.
Clare's victorious All-Ireland winning side had seven players in the hurling team of the year. Tony Kelly of Clare was also picked as The Sunday Game player of the year.

Anthony Nash (Cork)
Shane O’Neill (Cork)
David McInerney (Clare)
Peter Kelly (Dublin) 
Brendan Bugler (Clare)
Liam Rushe (Dublin) 
Pat Donnellan (Clare)
Paul Browne (Limerick)
Colm Galvin (Clare)
Seamus Harnedy (Cork)
Tony Kelly (Clare) 
Danny Sutcliffe (Dublin)
Podge Collins (Clare)
Patrick Horgan (Cork)
Conor McGrath (Clare)

GAA/GPA All Stars
The 2013 All-Star hurling team were announced on 6 November. Speaking at the announcement, GAA President Liam O'Neill said "This year's hurling selection was of particular interest to hurling followers everywhere after the incredible year we had, the players who have made the final cut can take particular satisfaction on doing so in a season of stiff competition as new teams and players emerged - something evidenced in the final make up of the team, I congratulate all 15 players - and those who were nominated too - as their inclusion further underlines their roles as excellent ambassadors through their commitment and dedication to the pursuit of excellence."

Tony Kelly of Clare was named Young Hurler of the Year and Hurler of the Year for 2013 at the All Stars award ceremony on 8 November at Croke Park.

Media

DVD release
In December 2013, LIAM 13 a double DVD was released containing highlights of the 2013 hurling championship season along with full match coverage of the final and final replay.

Documentary
A documentary called The Magic of Hurling aired on 27 December 2013 on RTÉ Two. This documentary featured Davy Fitzgerald, Anthony Daly and Ger Loughnane talking to Ger Canning about the 2013 year in hurling and discussing the tactics that brought the All-Ireland title to Clare.

See also
 2013 Clare county hurling team season
 2013 Tipperary county hurling team season

References

External links
Top 10 hurling moments of 2013 from The Sunday Game

2013 in hurling